Okete is an unincorporated community in Lincoln County, in the U.S. state of Missouri.

History
A post office called Okete was established in 1887, and remained in operation until 1907. The name was suggested by postal officials.

References

Unincorporated communities in Lincoln County, Missouri
Unincorporated communities in Missouri